The men's doubles tournament at the 1982 Australian Open was held from 29 November through 13 December 1982 on the outdoor grass courts at the Kooyong Stadium in Melbourne, Australia. John Alexander and John Fitzgerald won the title, defeating Andy Andrews and John Sadri in the final.

Seeds

Draw

Finals

Top half

Section 1

Section 2

Bottom half

Section 3

Section 4

External links
 1982 Australian Open – Men's draws and results at the International Tennis Federation

Men's Doubles
Australian Open (tennis) by year – Men's doubles